California's 70th State Assembly district is one of 80 California State Assembly districts. It is currently represented by Democrat Patrick O'Donnell of Long Beach.

District profile 
The district encompasses southern coastal Los Angeles County, centered on the Ports of Los Angeles and Long Beach. The district also includes part of the Channel Islands.

Los Angeles County – 4.8%
 Avalon
 Long Beach – 80.2%
 Los Angeles – 2.1%
 San Pedro
 Signal Hill

Election results from statewide races

List of Assembly Members 
Due to redistricting, the 70th district has been moved around different parts of the state. The current iteration resulted from the 2011 redistricting by the California Citizens Redistricting Commission.

Election results 1992 - present

2020

2018

2016

2014

2012

2010

2008

2006

2004

2002

2000

1998

1996

1994

1992

See also 
 California State Assembly
 California State Assembly districts
 Districts in California

References

External links 
 District map from the California Citizens Redistricting Commission

70
Government of Los Angeles County, California
Government of Los Angeles
Government in Long Beach, California
Los Angeles Harbor Region
San Pedro, Los Angeles
Signal Hill, California
Wilmington, Los Angeles
Channel Islands of California